MyoD family inhibitor is a protein that in humans is encoded by the MDFI gene.

Function 

This protein is a transcription factor that negatively regulates other myogenic family proteins. Studies of the mouse homolog, I-mf, show that it interferes with myogenic factor function by masking nuclear localization signals and preventing DNA binding. Knockout mouse studies show defects in the formation of vertebrae and ribs that also involve cartilage formation in these structures.

Interactions 

MDFI has been shown to interact with:
 C9orf86, 
 GNAI2,
 MyoD, 
 Myogenin, and
 SIX1.

References

Further reading